Caulaincourt can refer to:

 Armand Augustin Louis de Caulaincourt (1773–1827), French general and diplomat
 Auguste-Jean-Gabriel de Caulaincourt (1777-1812), French general
 Caulaincourt, Aisne, a commune of the Aisne département, in France

See also 
 Rue de Caulaincourt, street adjacent to Lamarck – Caulaincourt (Paris Métro) station